Nebo National Forest was established by the U.S. Forest Service in Utah on July 1, 1908 with  from the consolidation of Payson and Vernon National Forests and part of Fillmore.  On July 1, 1915 the entire forest was transferred to Manti National Forest.  The lands presently exist in Manti-La Sal National Forest.

References

External links
Forest History Society
Listing of the National Forests of the United States and Their Dates (from the Forest History Society website) Text from Davis, Richard C., ed. Encyclopedia of American Forest and Conservation History. New York: Macmillan Publishing Company for the Forest History Society, 1983. Vol. II, pp. 743-788.

Former National Forests of Utah